Weetabix Ltd., trading under the name Weetabix Food Company and commonly referred to as simply Weetabix, is a food processing company that is responsible for the production of breakfast cereal brands, including Weetabix, Alpen, Crunchy Bran and Ready Brek. The company also produces Puffins cereal and Snackimals snacks through their Barbara's Bakery division.

History
See History of Weet-Bix

The food product was originally invented in Australia in the 1920s by Bennison Osborne. Osborne and his friend Malcolm MacFarlane successfully launched Weet-Biscs in Australia and New Zealand under the sponsorship of the owner of Grain Products Ltd., who soon sold the Australasian rights to the Australasian Conference Association Limited Sanitarium Health and Wellbeing Company.  Osborne and MacFarlane decided to expand into South Africa and while there, they began the establishment of the British & African Cereal Company, Ltd., a Private Company, to start a venture in England under the Companies Act 1929 (Company No. 267687), where they became joint Managing Directors until MacFarlane left the Company in 1932/1933, after which Osborne became the sole managing director until 1936, when he left the Company for the United States of America.  The first Directors of the Company were Bennison Osborne, Malcolm MacFarlane, Alfred Richard Upton and Arthur Stanley Scrutton. Frank George, who had offered them the use of a disused flour mill in Burton Latimer, Northamptonshire, subsequently requested and was granted shares in the Company and was offered a place on the Board.

The company holds a royal warrant from Queen Elizabeth II. 

For the purpose of differentiating between the various countries, it was decided that the product, when introduced into the United Kingdom, should be known as "Weetabix". On 13 August 1936, with the approval of the Board of Trade, the Company name was changed to Weetabix Limited.

Alpen was invented in 1971, when a company executive was on holiday in Switzerland and tasted a local delicacy.

In November 2003, the company was bought from Weetabix Limited, by the American private equity firm HM Capital of Dallas. From 29 January 2004, it was owned by Lion Capital LLP, until 3 May 2012 when the Chinese company Bright Food bought a 60% controlling stake, valuing the company at £1.2bn ($1.9bn).

In 2012 the company was bought by the Chinese Government through the state-run Bright Food, and the equity firm Baring Private Equity Asia, with Bright Food having the controlling interest. 

In July 2017, the American company Post Holdings bought the company for £1.4 billion.

The company does not have the rights to the product in Australia, New Zealand or South Africa. In these countries, the brand is still known as Weet-Bix and is still made by Sanitarium Health Food Company in Australia and New Zealand and Bokomo in South Africa.

In 2021, Weetabix faced strike action over a decision to make workers redundant and re-employ them on lower wages, a practice known as fire-and-rehire.

Awards
It has won three Queen's Awards for Export, lastly in 2004.

Company structure
The company is headquartered in Burton Latimer, Kettering, Northamptonshire, England, and its  site is next to the A14 junction with the A6. It also has factories in Corby and Ashton-under-Lyne. The company produces 3 billion Weetabix breakfast biscuits every year from its Kettering site.
 
Weetabix is also one of the major manufacturers of generic cereals for the major supermarkets.

Weetabix has factories in Europe, East Africa and North America. It is the largest producer of breakfast cereals in the UK. It exports to eighty countries. As of 2012 it employed around 2000 people.

Brands

Alpen

Barbara's Bakery
The California-based natural-foods company was purchased by Weetabix in 1986, eventually moving operations to Marlborough, Massachusetts. They are particularly well known for their Puffins Cereal line.

In 2019-2020 the packaging for Barbara's Bakery cereals was revamped 

, and on the new packaging all references to "The Weetabix Company, Inc." have been replaced with references to "Three Sisters Cereal".

Crunchy Bran

GrainShop
Sold primarily in the North American market, the GrainShop brand has two cereals, High Fibre Crisp and Honey Almond Crunch. High Fibre Crisp is a blend of four grains, wheat and corn, bran and oats, while Honey Almond Crunch is a combination of crunchy oats, flakes, almonds and honey.

Oatibix
Products in the Oatibix range are made from oats, as opposed to the company's preference to wheat-based food. The original Oatibix cereal is physically very similar to the company's flagship Weetabix but made of whole grain oats. Oatibix Bitesize is a variant of Oatibix with smaller biscuits and is available as Oatibix Bitesize Sultana & Apple or Oatibix Bitesize Chocolate & Raisin in addition to the original flavour.

Oatibix Flakes

Ready Brek

Ready Brek is an oat-based breakfast cereal that is intended to be served hot, and comes in three varieties; 'Original', 'Chocolate' and 'Seriously Oaty'. A butterscotch flavour was marketed during the 1970s.

Weetabix

Weetabix is a whole grain wheat breakfast cereal that comes in the form of palm-sized biscuits. It is Weetabix Food Company's flagship product, introduced in 1932 and is officially the top-selling breakfast cereal in the United Kingdom, accounting for 8% of the country's total cereal sales. The cereal, which is manufactured in facilities in Kettering, England and Canada, is exported to 80 countries and has annual sales worth over £95 million.

Weetabix Bitesize is essentially a smaller "bite-sized" version of Weetabix that can be easily poured into a bowl, more like a traditional breakfast cereal. Weetabix Minis are sweeter variant of the Weetabix Bitesize, with various additions depending upon the variety; Chocolate Crisp, Banana Crisp, Fruit & Nut Crisp, and Honey & Nut Crisp. Outside of the UK, Weetabix Minis has been re-launched and renamed at least twice in a relatively short period of time following their launch. Previously, they were known as Fruitibix, Bananabix, and Chocobix (depending upon the additions), then as Minibix.

Weetaflakes

Weetos

Sponsorship
Weetabix was the title sponsor of the Women's British Open between 1987 and 2006. It has also previously sponsored Northamptonshire Police, most recently providing a mobile police station in 2004. It was one of the sponsors of the World Cup in Argentina in 1978. Weetabix was the main sponsor of the first BMX World Championships
https://en.m.wikipedia.org/wiki/UCI_BMX_World_Championships
to be held in the UK in 1986. These Championships were held at Slough in Berkshire, atracting over 2,000 racers from across the world.

References

External links

News items
 Prince Charles, a fan of Weetabix, in 2004
 Bought by Hicks Muse Tate & Furst in November 2003 for £642m

Food manufacturers of the United Kingdom
Breakfast cereal companies
Food and drink companies established in 1932
Companies based in Northamptonshire
British Royal Warrant holders
British companies established in 1932
British brands
Post Holdings
2017 mergers and acquisitions
British subsidiaries of foreign companies